Who Will Answer? (and Other Songs of Our Time) is an album by pop vocalist Ed Ames, featuring two original songs (the album title track and "Pale Venetian Blind") and nine cover versions of popular hits from the 1960s.  The album peaked at #13 on the Billboard charts in the spring of 1968 and was certified gold by the RIAA.

Track listing

Side 1
Who Will Answer? (Aleluya No. 1) (3:42) (by Luis Eduardo Aute)
Blowin' in the Wind (3:23) (by Bob Dylan)
Yesterday (2:04) (by The Beatles)
Monday, Monday (3:14) (by The Mamas and the Papas)
Pale Venetian Blind (1:51)
Massachusetts (2:18) (by the Bee Gees)

Side 2
I Wanna Be Free (2:20) By the Monkees
Cherish (3:13) By the Association
The Other Man's Grass Is Always Greener (2:53) By Petula Clark
Can't Take My Eyes Off You (2:53) By Frankie Valli
There's a Kind of Hush (All Over The World) (2:50) By Herman's Hermits

Production 
 Recorded at: RCA Victor's Music Center of the World, Hollywood, California.

References

1968 albums
Ed Ames albums
RCA Victor albums